In Greek mythology, Eunomia was a minor goddess of law and legislation (her name can be translated as "good order", "governance according to good laws"), as well as the spring-time goddess of green pastures (eû means "well, good" in Greek, and νόμος, nómos, means "law", while pasturelands are called nomia). She is by most accounts the daughter of Themis and Zeus. Her opposite number was Dysnomia (Lawlessness).

Horae
Eunomia was the goddess of law and legislation and one of the Second Generation of the Horae along with her sisters Dikē and Eirene. The Horae were law and order goddesses who maintained the stability of society, and were worshipped primarily in the cities of Athens, Argos and Olympia. From Pindar:
Eunomia and that unsullied fountain Dikē, her sister, sure support of cities; and Eirene of the same kin, who are the stewards of wealth for humanity—three glorious daughters of wise-counselled Themis.

Eunomia's name, together with that of her sisters, formed a Hendiatris Good Order, Justice, and Peace.

She was frequently depicted in Athenian vase painting amongst the companions of Aphrodite, and in this sense represented the lawful or obedient behavior of women in marriage. As such she was identified with Eurynome, mother of the Charites (Graces).

Legacy
The Eunomia family of asteroids are named after her.

Notes

References
 Grimal, Pierre, The Dictionary of Classical Mythology, Wiley-Blackwell, 1996, . "Horae" p. 217
 Smith, William; Dictionary of Greek and Roman Biography and Mythology, London (1873). "Horae" 

Justice goddesses
Greek goddesses
Children of Zeus
Personifications in Greek mythology
Eunomia asteroids
Horae